Kiprono Koskei (born 1988) is a Kenyan sprinter.

He won gold at the 2015 African Games as part of the 4x400 metre relay team.
He also competed at 2016 African Championships in Athletics as part of the 400 metres hurdles team.

References

1988 births
Living people
Kenyan male sprinters
Kenyan male hurdlers
Athletes (track and field) at the 2018 Commonwealth Games
African Games medalists in athletics (track and field)
African Games gold medalists for Kenya
Athletes (track and field) at the 2015 African Games
Commonwealth Games competitors for Kenya
21st-century Kenyan people